Hervey de Saham (also Seham) was an English medieval Canon law jurist and university chancellor.

De Saham was a Professor of Canon law. He was Guardian of the Franciscans (or Friars Minor) in Oxfordshire. From 1285 to 1289, he was Chancellor of the University of Oxford.

References

Year of birth unknown
Year of death unknown
Canon law jurists
English legal scholars
English Friars Minor
Chancellors of the University of Oxford
13th-century English people